Presidential elections were held in Guinea for the first time on 15 January 1961. Incumbent Ahmed Sékou Touré, who had automatically become President when the country gained independence in 1958, was the only candidate (as the country as a one-party state with his Democratic Party of Guinea as the sole legal party at the time), and was re-elected unopposed.

Results

References

Guinea
Presidential elections in Guinea
1961 in Guinea
Single-candidate elections
One-party elections